Humes is a surname. Notable people with the surname include:

Cedric Humes (born 1983), American football running back 
Edward Humes, American journalist
Harold L. Humes (1926–1992), American writer
Helen Humes (1913–1981), American jazz and blues singer
James C. Humes, American writer
Jimmy Humes (born 1942), English footballer
Mary-Margaret Humes (born 1954), American actress
Marvin Humes (born 1985), British boy band member
Rochelle Humes (born 1989), English singer and television presenter
Tony Humes (born 1966), English footballer
William Y.C. Humes (1830–1883), Confederate general